St. Benedict Catholic Secondary School is a high school in Greater Sudbury, Ontario, run by the Sudbury Catholic District School Board. Located on Algonquin Road in the city's south end, the school opened in 1996. The school has a population of just over 500 students.  Its mascot is a bear.

See also
List of high schools in Ontario

Sports

Catholic secondary schools in Ontario
High schools in Greater Sudbury
1996 establishments in Ontario
Educational institutions established in 1996